Brengkes is a Javanese word that refers to a specific dish, i.e. a fish slathered with spices and wrapped in a banana leaf.

The most commonly used fish is a "pindang", which is a Javanese word for a fermented fish. Hence "brengkes pindang" is the most popular type of this dish. Peda (salted fish) can also be used.

Etymology
The Javanese word "brengkes" is commonly used to refer to this dish. Some people call it "brengkesan" (brengkes, suffix -an) which actually means "the many types of brengkes".

Not to be confused with "brongkos", a very different dish from Java.

Cooking method
To cook a brengkes, prepare the spices and fish or vegetables you're going to use as the main ingredient. Brengkes godhong pohung will need cassava leaves. Brengkes pindang will need a pindang fish, which is a fermented fish commonly eaten in Java. There are different types of pindang fish. Mostly used are pindang tongkol and salem.

Gather all the ingredients. Pound the spices with a mortar, put a part of it on a banana leaf, put the pindang fish or cassava leaves on, then put the remaining spices.

If the fish is too small, you can add shredded coconut into the spice mixture, to give it a little bit of weight. It might look similar to a botok at this point, but in case of botok, you must cut the fish into small pieces. Brengkes requires you to use a whole fish.

Variants
There are different types of brengkes, like brengkes pindang, brengkes peda, brengkes godhong sembukan, and brengkes godhong pohung.

Brengkes has been introduced to other regions by Javanese diaspora or by colonial ties:

Brengkes tempoyak (Palembang), where tempoyak sauce is used.
Brengkes daoen poehoeng (Dutch). Daoen is an Indonesian word for leaf, while poehoeng (new romanized spelling: pohung) is a Javanese word for cassava.

Similar dishes
Pepes (Sundanese).
Pesan, Tum (Balinese).
Palai, paley (Sumatrans).

References

Javanese cuisine
Javanese diaspora